Sant'Elpidio a Mare is a town and comune in the province of Fermo, in the Marche region of Italy.

Geography 

Toponym 
The historical name of locality is documented by an 11th century parchment as "Sancto Elpidio Majore" to distinguish it from other places in Sant'Elpidio Morico Brand Fermana. The abbreviation of "majore" was later changed to "mare" ("sea" in Italian).

History 
The town occupies the site of the ancient Roman city of Cluana, destroyed by the Visigoths in the early 5th century. In 887 here a large Benedictine Abbey was founded in 887; the medieval borough rose around it as Castello di Sant'Elpidio, starting from the 11th century.

Main sights 
Imperial Abbey of Santa Croce al Chienti. This is a Benedictine convent founded, according to tradition, in 887 on a pre-existing religious building. The heyday of the abbey was between the 10th and the 12th century in which it was enlarged and renovated in Romanesque style. 
Church of Madonna dei Lumi
Church of Sant'Elpidio Abate
Sanctuary of Madonna degli Angeli
Church of Sant'Agostino (14th century)
Torre Gerosolimitana ("Tower of the Knights of Jerusalem"), built by the Knights Hospitaller in the 16th century
Town Hall (14th century)

See also 
Porto Sant'Elpidio

References

External links 

History of the town